Lee Mi-gyeong (born 2 October 1991) is a South Korean handball player for Busan BISCO and the South Korean national team.

Club career
Lee started her club career in the Seoul City handball club in 2010. After being hampered by several injuries in Seoul for 4 years, Lee moved to Wonderful Daegu in 2014. She went on to become the key player in the Daegu's regular lineup, leading the team's offense in assists and goals every season in the Handball Korea League. In 2016 The Hiroshima Maple Reds of the Japan Handball League signed Lee. Lee compiled 358 goals in 50 games in the JHL while playing in the Hiroshima Maple Reds and Hidatakayama Black Bulls for 3 years. In 2019 Lee returned to South Korea to play for the Busan BISCO handball club.

National team
Lee was named to the team representing South Korea at the Summer Olympics held from 27 July to 12 August 2012 in London, United Kingdom. While South Korea had seized six medals, including gold in 1988 and 1992, in seven Olympic women's handball appearances, Lee and her team failed to win medals at the 2012 Olympics by losing to Spain 31–29  in double overtime in the bronze medal match.

In 2017, Lee was named to the national team which competed in the IHF World Championships in Germany. The team advanced to round of 16 and faced world No. 2 ranked Russia. Despite 11 goals from Lee and 10 from Ryu Eun-hee, South Korea fell 36–35 after extra time.

In December 2019 Lee was called up to the South Korean national team and competed in the 2019 IHF World Handball Championship.

References

External links

Living people
1991 births
Handball players at the 2012 Summer Olympics
Olympic handball players of South Korea
South Korean female handball players
Universiade medalists in handball
Expatriate handball players
South Korean expatriate sportspeople in Japan
Handball players from Seoul
Universiade silver medalists for South Korea
Medalists at the 2015 Summer Universiade
Handball players at the 2020 Summer Olympics